Robert Gwaze (b. 1982) is a Zimbabwean chess player born in Harare, Zimbabwe. He is a former student at Prince Edward School, in Harare. At age 15 he was a Zimbabwe National Chess Champion at both junior and senior levels.

Gwaze won the 1998 African Junior Championship in Nairobi, Kenya, which earned him the International Master (IM) title. Probably his greatest success was at the 2002 Chess Olympiad tournament in Bled, Slovenia when he achieved a rare perfect score, winning all nine of his games on  first board for Zimbabwe, an achievement that only he and Alexander Alekhine did.

In 2007, he won the African Individual Chess Championship in Windhoek, Namibia, earning a spot in the 2007 Chess World Cup.  In this qualification tournament for the 2010 Chess World Championship Gwaze was eliminated in the first round by fifth-seed Alexei Shirov. In 2010 he came first in the Cuca Trophy international tournament in Luanda, Angola. He took part in the Chess World Cup 2011, but was eliminated in the first round by former FIDE World Champion Ruslan Ponomariov.

References

External links

Living people
Zimbabwean chess players
Chess International Masters
Chess Olympiad competitors
Alumni of Prince Edward School
1982 births
African Games gold medalists for Zimbabwe
African Games medalists in chess
People from Harare
Competitors at the 2011 All-Africa Games